Julieta Grajales (born April 24, 1986) is a Mexican actress, She is known for her roles in the telenovelas and series as La Taxista, El Chema, El Señor de los Cielos and La Impostora.

Her first appearance was in the TV Azteca's telenovela Vidas robadas in 2010, appeared in 2012 Telemundo's telenovela La Impostora as Catalina Echeverría Estrada de Altamira, she had a friendship and then a relationship with the American singer Laura Pergolizzi (known as: LP) which began in 2019 and participated in the music video How Low Can You Go in 2021, the short-lived relationship ended in May 2022.

Filmography

Films

Television roles

Music videos

References

External links 

1986 births
Living people
Mexican telenovela actresses
Mexican television actresses
21st-century LGBT people
People from Chiapas
Actresses from Chiapas
Mexican LGBT actors